The 2010 Northern Ireland Youth Soccer Tournament was the 2010 edition of a prestigious youth association football tournament that has been running annually since 1983. Teams from around the world competed in a week-long tournament in the North Coast area of Northern Ireland. The teams were divided into three categories: Elite, Premier, and Junior for Under-19s, Under-17s and Under-15s respectively. The 2010 Milk Cup Tournament ran between the 26 and 30 July 2010, with Northern Ireland (Elite), Manchester United (Premier) and Everton (Junior) all returning to defend their 2009 titles.

The Elite section had six teams in 2010, with each team playing two group matches. The top two teams in the table after the group stage competed in the final. Group matches were played on Monday and Wednesday, with the final and play-offs for positions taking part on the final day, Friday.

The Junior and Premier sections were contested by 24 teams. Each team played once on Monday and Tuesday as part of a league, from which the top 8 teams qualified for the Milk Cup quarter-finals on Wednesday. The remainder of the teams qualified for lower-level cups that ran alongside the Milk Cup, with quarter-finals on the Wednesday, semi-finals on Thursday, and the finals on Friday. In 2010, for the first time the finals night were held at the Ballymena Showgrounds, rather than the traditional venue of the Coleraine Showgrounds. There were a number of new teams competing this year, from Venezuela, Spain, Norway, China, Belgium and Israel amongst others.

Elite – Under 19s – national sides
Premier – Under 17s – club sides and national sides
Junior – Under 15s – club sides and national sides

Clubs and national teams from anywhere in the world may compete on invitation, and in 2010 five continents were represented - Europe, North America, South America, Africa and Asia.

Venues

Elite Section

Squads

China

Denmark

Japan

Mexico

Northern Ireland

United States

Head coach Thomas Rongen announced the United States roster on July 19. Given age as of the first United States match on July 26.

Tournament

Group stage

5th Place Playoff

3rd Place Playoff

Final

Premier section

  County Antrim
  County Armagh
  County Down
  County Fermanagh
  County Londonderry
  County Tyrone
   Shamrock Rovers
  Cherry Orchard
  Belvedere
  Donegal Schoolboys
  Queen of the South
  Hartlepool United
  Tottenham Hotspur
  Bolton Wanderers
  Manchester United
  KV Mechelen
  Etoile Lusitana
  Aspire
  FC Porto
  Club Marcet
  San Agustin
  Desportivo Brasil
  Cruz Azul
  South Coast Bayern

Junior section

  Aspire Academy
  Club Marcet
  Brentford
  Chelsea
  County Antrim
  County Armagh
  County Down
  County Fermanagh
  County Londonderry
  County Tyrone
  Cruz Azul
  Dundalk
  Everton
  Hapoel Be'er Sheva
  Hapoel Haifa
  Kashima Antlers
  Plymouth Argyle
  Puebla
  Queen of the South
  South Coast Bayern
  Spartak Moscow
  Swindon Town
  Våg
  Watford

References

External links
http://www.nimilkcup.org
http://www.bbc.co.uk/northernireland/milkcup/

2010
2010 in association football
Milk